Alamnagar railway station is a railway station in Lucknow, Uttar Pradesh. Its code is AMG. It serves Rajajipuram area of Lucknow. The station consists of three platforms. The platforms are not well sheltered. It lacks many facilities including water and sanitation. Currently the station is converting into satellite station.

References 

Lucknow NR railway division
Railway stations in Lucknow district